The Women's 3 m synchro springboard competition of the 2014 European Aquatics Championships was held on 23 August.

Results
The preliminary round was held at 12:00 and the final at 18:00.

Green denotes finalists

References

2014 European Aquatics Championships